Child Indicators Research is a bimonthly peer-reviewed scientific journal covering research on well-being in children. It was established in 2008 and is published by Springer Science+Business Media on behalf of the International Society for Child Indicators, of which it is the official journal. The editors-in-chief are Asher Ben-Arieh (Hebrew University of Jerusalem), Bong Joo Lee (Seoul National University), and Christine Hunner-Kreisel (University of Vechta). According to the Journal Citation Reports, the journal has a 2020 impact factor of 2.420.

References

External links

Springer Science+Business Media academic journals
Well-being
English-language journals
Publications established in 2008
Bimonthly journals